Deon Lee (Hangul: 디온 리) is a South Korean born composer known for his works on films 1895 and Papa.

Upon graduating from Berklee College of Music with a scholarship, he has worked with Velton Ray Bunch as an assistant composer for the television movie The Tenth Circle which premiered on Lifetime channel. In 2008, Lee was asked to score for the Taiwanese film Blue Brave: The Legend of Formosa in 1895 (a.k.a. 一八九五) which was released and distributed by 20th Century Fox Taiwan and has aired on Hakka TV stations. The movie won the Best Drama Series Award at the 14th Asian Television Awards and was chosen the best 10 films of the Chinese Film Critic Association that year.

Filmography

Films

Awards and nominations 
Lee was the recipient of the Best Soundtrack Award and appeared as a special guest with Stephen McEveety at the 4th Pan Pacific Film Festival in 2011. His music was nominated at the 1st International Fashion Film Awards in La Jolla, California, where his original score to the dance film Lilith by Eric Chang won the Best Creative Concept Award at the La Jolla Fashion Film Festival. In 2014, Badbug, a South Korean drama thriller short film he had scored won the Best Comics-Oriented Award at the Comic-Con International Independent Film Festival.

References

External links 
 Official Website
 

1982 births
Berklee College of Music alumni
USC Thornton School of Music alumni
South Korean film score composers
People from Seoul
Living people